Nationality words link to articles with information on the nation's poetry or literature (for instance, Irish or France).

Events

Works published

Births
Death years link to the corresponding "[year] in poetry" article. There are conflicting or unreliable sources for the birth years of many people born in this period; where sources conflict, the poet is listed again and the conflict is noted:

1090:
 Eliezer ben Nathan (died 1170), halakist and liturgical poet, in Hebrew

1092:
 Abraham ibn Ezra (died 1164), Hebrew poet in Al-Andalus

1098:
 Hildegard of Bingen (died 1179), German writer, composer, philosopher, Christian mystic, Benedictine abbess, visionary, polymath, poet, and producer of miniature Illuminations

Deaths
Birth years link to the corresponding "[year] in poetry" article:

1091:
 March 26 – Wallada bint al-Mustakfi (born 1001), Arab Andalusian poet of Arabic language

1092:
 Nizam al-Mulk (born 1018), Persian scholar and vizier of the Seljuq Empire

1095:
 Abu l-Hasan al-Husri
 Muhammad Ibn Abbad Al Mutamid (born 1040), Arabic poet in Al-Andalus

See also

 Poetry
 11th century in poetry
 11th century in literature
 List of years in poetry

Other events:
 Other events of the 12th century
 Other events of the 13th century

11th century:
 11th century in poetry
 11th century in literature

Notes

11th-century poetry
Poetry